Justin Broad (born 30 June 2000) is a South African-born cricketer who plays for the Germany national team. Born in Cape Town, Broad excelled in school cricket and was selected to play for Western Province in national under-15s and under-17s tournaments. In 2019, Broad moved to England to play club cricket for Bury St Edmunds Cricket Club in the East Anglian Premier Cricket League, finishing as the club's top-scorer in his first season. Broad also represented the Marylebone Cricket Club Young Cricketers, and later joined Esher Cricket Club in 2021 to play in the Surrey Championship. He has also played for the second XI at Surrey County Cricket Club.

In February 2022, he was named in Germany's Twenty20 International (T20I) squad for the 2022 ICC Men's T20 World Cup Global Qualifier A. Broad made his T20I debut on 18 February 2022, for Germany against Bahrain. In his second T20I the following day, he top-scored for Germany with a half century against the United Arab Emirates.

References

External links 
 

2000 births
German cricketers
Germany Twenty20 International cricketers
Living people